The Nassau County Courthouse is a courthouse in Nassau County, on Long Island, in New York, United States. It is located at 262 Old Country Road in the Village of Garden City – although it uses the Mineola, New York 11501 ZIP Code and post office.

History 
The Nassau County Courthouse was built in 1940, after the older Nassau County Courthouse was determined to be too small for the needs of a rapidly-growing Nassau County. The building was constructed as part of a Public Works Administration project, along with the other two structures built at the complex as part of the project.

The County of Nassau hired architect and county resident Lawrence Lincoln in 1938 to design the new complex.

The building was added to the National Register of Historic Places in March 2021.

References 

County courthouses in New York (state)
Courthouses on the National Register of Historic Places in New York (state)
National Register of Historic Places in Nassau County, New York
Garden City, New York